This is an episode list of the Channel 4 documentary television series Faking It. Dates shown are original air date.

Series 1: 2000

Series 2: 2001

Series 3: 2001

Series 4: 2002

==Series 5: 2004==

==Series 6: 2004==

Series 7: 2006

References

Lists of British non-fiction television series episodes
2000s television-related lists